Chehel Gaz (also known as Chākīāl, Chalgial, and Chelgazī) is a village in Sardabeh Rural District, in the Central District of Ardabil County, Ardabil Province, Iran. At the 2006 census, its population was 196, in 37 families.

References 

Towns and villages in Ardabil County